Baby-Face Mouse is a Walter Lantz character, who made his first appearance in the cartoon Cheese-Nappers, in 1938. He starred in nine cartoons over two years, with his final appearance in 1939, in Snuffy's Party as a cameo.

List of appearances
Cheese-Nappers (07/04/1938)
The Big Cat And The Little Mousie (08/15/1938) - reissued as The Big Cat And The Little Mouse
The Cat And The Bell (10/03/1938)
Sailor Mouse (11/07/1938) - reissued as Willie Mouse - Sailor Boy
The Disobedient Mouse (11/28/1938) - reissued as Baby Face Battler
I'm Just A Jitterbug (01/23/1939) - sketch in background only
The Magic Beans (02/13/1939) - Baby-Face Mouse as Beanie
Little Tough Mice (03/13/1939) - reissued as Crime Buster
Arabs With Dirty Fezzes (07/31/1939) - reissued as The Arabs With Dirty Fezzes
Snuffy's Party (08/07/1939) - cameo appearance

See also
List of Walter Lantz cartoons
List of Walter Lantz cartoon characters

References

External links 
 The Walter Lantz-o-Pedia

Universal Pictures cartoons and characters
Walter Lantz Productions shorts
Fictional mice and rats
Film characters introduced in 1938
Male characters in animation
Walter Lantz Productions cartoons and characters